The 2014 Mackay Cutters season was the seventh in the club's history. Coached by Kim Williams and captained by Tyson Martin, they competed in the QRL's Intrust Super Cup. The club were unable to defend their premiership, finishing ninth and missing the finals.

Season summary
The Cutters faced an uphill struggle to win back-to-back premierships after losing a number of their 2013 Grand Final-winning side. Tyson Andrews, Bureta Faraimo and Matt Minto were all signed by NRL clubs, captain Jardine Bobongie returned to local rugby league, while North Queensland Cowboys players Michael Morgan and Jason Taumalolo became regular first graders. Tyson Martin returned to the club full-time after being released by the Cowboys and was named the club's captain.

The Cutters won 11 of their 24 games, finishing ninth. Cowboys-contracted fullback Zac Santo was named the club's Player of the Year at the end of the season.

Squad List

2014 squad

Squad movement

Gains

Losses

Fixtures

Regular season

Statistics

Honours

Club
Player of the Year: Zac Santo
Players' Player: Dan Beasley
Sponsor's Player of the Year: Dan Beasley
Rookie of the Year: Mitch Day
Spirit of the Cutters award: Chris Gesch
Club Person of the Year: Ben Miles

References

2014 in Australian rugby league
2014 in rugby league by club
Mackay Cutters